Bruno Miguel Moreira de Sousa (born 24 September 1982), known as Bruno Miguel, is a Portuguese former professional footballer who played as a central defender.

Club career
Bruno Miguel was born in São João da Madeira, Porto metropolitan area. Until the age of 23, he played in either the third or fourth divisions of Portuguese football, signing in the 2005 off-season with Varzim S.C. of the Segunda Liga and appearing in 31 games in his first year.

Bruno Miguel made his Primeira Liga debut in 2007–08, playing 25 minutes for U.D. Leiria in a 1–1 away draw against Académica de Coimbra on 26 August 2007. He finished the campaign with 16 league matches (his personal best with the club), and the team suffered relegation.

After three more seasons with Leiria being used mostly as a backup, 29-year-old Bruno Miguel joined FC Astra Ploieşti of the Romanian Liga I. He returned to his country the following summer, being third or fourth-choice stopper during his four-year tenure in the top flight with G.D. Estoril Praia (a maximum of 12 appearances in 2013–14); with the latter, he also appeared in eight games in the UEFA Europa League, scoring in the 2013–14 edition in a 1–2 group stage home loss to eventual winners Sevilla FC.

References

External links

1982 births
Living people
People from São João da Madeira
Portuguese footballers
Association football defenders
Primeira Liga players
Liga Portugal 2 players
Segunda Divisão players
A.D. Sanjoanense players
FC Porto B players
G.D. Tourizense players
Varzim S.C. players
U.D. Leiria players
G.D. Estoril Praia players
Académico de Viseu F.C. players
F.C. Alverca players
Liga I players
FC Astra Giurgiu players
Portuguese expatriate footballers
Expatriate footballers in Romania
Portuguese expatriate sportspeople in Romania
Sportspeople from Aveiro District